This is a list of notable twins, siblings resultant from a multiple birth.

Actors 
 Kaya and Sarp Akkaya (1980–)
 Shawn and Aaron Ashmore (1979–)
 Conrad (1923–2013) and Bonar Bain (1923–2005)
 Gayle and Gillian Blakeney (1966–)
 Billy Mauch (1921–2006) and Bobby Mauch (1921–2007)
 The Borden Twins, Marilyn (1932–2009) and Rosalyn (1932–2003)
 Julie and Clare Buckfield (1976–)
 Louis and Carlos Campos, The Fabulous Wonder Twins (1967–)
 Charlie and Max Carver (1988–)
 Manpei and Shinpei Takagi (1985–)
 Andrew and Steven Cavarno (1992–)
 Christian and Joseph Cousins (1983–)
 Dennis (1934–1991) and Phillip Crosby (1934–2004)
 Brittany and Cynthia Daniel (1976–)
 Angela and Maureen Deiseach (1972–)
 The Dolly Sisters, Rosie (1892–1970) and Jenny (1892–1941)
 Melanie and Martina Grant (1971–)
 Lindsay and Sidney Greenbush (1970–)
 Deidre and Andrea Hall (1947–)
 Pili y Mili (1947-)
 Jon and Dan Heder (1977–)
 Jill and Jacqueline Hennessy (1968–)
 Linda and Terry Jamison (1965–)
 Brent and Shane Kinsman (1997–)
 Camille and Kennerly Kitt
 Gary and Larry Lane (1975–)
 Mirtha and Silvia Legrand (1927–)
 Spencer and Peyton List (1998–)
 Jason and Jeremy London (1972–)
 Frankie and George McLaren (1997)
 David and Anthony Meyer (1972–)
 Tony and Kelly L. Moran (1957–)
 Markieff and Marcus Morris (1989–)
 Tia and Tamera Mowry (1978–)
 Erin and Diane Murphy (1964–)
 Mary-Kate and Ashley Olsen (1986–)
 Jeni and Kyndi Niquette (1988–)
 Rachel and Amanda Pace (2000–)
 Pier Angeli (1932–1971) and Marisa Pavan (1932–)
 Ryan and Kyle Pepi (1993–)
 James and Oliver Phelps (1986–)
 Raymond and Richard Gutierrez (1984–)
 Connie and Cassie Powney (1983–)
 Kathryn and Megan Prescott (1991–)
 Felix and Dominic Roco (1989–)
 Giovanni and Marissa Ribisi (1974–)
 Camilla and Rebecca Rosso (1994–)
 Liz and Jean Sagal (1961–)
 Keith and Kevin Schultz (1953–)
 Jason and Kristopher Simmons (2002–)
 Jason and Randy Sklar (1972–)
 Alicia and Annie Sorell (1979–)
 Gabriela and Daniela Spanic (1973–)
 Dylan and Cole Sprouse (1992–)
 Elliott and Luke Tittensor (1989–)
 David and Nicholle Tom (1978–)
 Harry and Luke Treadaway (1984–)
 Blake and Dylan Tuomy-Wilhoit (1990–)
 Keaton and Kylie Rae Tyndall (1992–)
 Lauren and Loraine Vélez (1964–)
 Lee and Lyn Wilde (1922–2015 & 2016)

Artists
 Dean and Dan Caten (1964–)
 Os Gêmeos (1974–) 
 Tim (1939–2006) and Greg Hildebrandt (1939–)
 Masashi and Seishi Kishimoto (1974–)
 Moses (1899–1974) and Raphael Soyer (1899–1987)
 Doug and Mike Starn (1961–)
 Jerome Witkin and Joel-Peter Witkin (1939–)
 Anton Pieck (1895-1987) and Henri Pieck (1895-1972)

Authors and writers
 Julius (1909–2000) and Philip Epstein (1909–1952)
 Julia DeVillers and Jennifer Roy
 Matthew and Michael Dickman (1975–)
 Austin and Lev Grossman (1969–)
 Alex and Brett Harris (1988–)
 Linda and Terry Jamison (1965–)
 Eppie Lederer (1918–2002) and Pauline Phillips (1918–2013), née Esther Pauline Friedman and Pauline Esther Friedman; professionally known, respectively, as Ann Landers (from 1955) and Abigail Van Buren/Dear Abby
 Ross (1925–1975) and Norris McWhirter (1925–2004)
 Anthony (1926–2001) and Peter Shaffer (1926–2016)
 Agnes (1843–1926) and Margaret Smith (1843–1920)
Brittany and Brianna Winner (1995)

Businesspeople
 David and Frederick Barclay (1934–)
 Randolph Apperson Hearst and David Whitmire Hearst
 Bill and Bob Meistrell
 Cameron and Tyler Winklevoss (born 1981)
 Freelan Oscar Stanley and Francis Edgar Stanley

Comedians
 Ethan and Grayson Dolan (1999–)
 Jim (1941–2008) and Jon Hager (1941–2009)
 Luke and Jai Brooks, from The Janoskians (1995–)
Hodgetwins (1974–)
Kenny and Keith Lucas (1985–)
Veronica and Vanessa Merrell (1996–)
 Randy and Jason Sklar (1972–)

Criminals
 Ursula and Sabina Eriksson
 Albert (1857–1937) and Ebenezer Fox (1857–1926)
 June (1963–) and Jennifer Gibbons (1963–1993)
 Carey Dean Moore and David Moore
 Jasmiyah and Tasmiyah Whitehead (1993–)
 Jeena and Sunny Han (1974–)
 Ronnie (1933–1995) and Reggie Kray (1933–2000)
 Paul and Chris Dawson (1948–)

Twins in dance
 Peter Frame (1957–2018) and Paul Frame, (1957–) ballet dancers
 Emma Slater and Kelly Slater in Dancing with the Stars
 Les Twins Laurent and Larry Nicolas Bourgeois, French Hip Hop dancers, winners of 2017 World of Dance

Filmmakers
 Nicola and Teena Collins (1978–)
 John (1913–1985) and Roy Boulting (1913–2001)
 Allen and Albert Hughes (1972–)
 George (1942–2011) and Mike Kuchar (1942–)
 Gary and Larry Lane (1975–)
 John Lasseter (1957–)
 Mark and Michael Polish (1970–)
 Stephen and Timothy Quay (1947–)
 Jen and Sylvia Soska (1983–)
 Matt and Ross Duffer (1984–)

Models
 Shane and Sia Barbi (1963–)
 Derek and Keith Brewer (1973–)
 Kyle and Lane Carlson (1978–)
 Ava and Leah Clements (2010–)
 Richard and Raymond Gutierrez (1984–)
 Monique and Ingrid Kavelaars (1971–)
 Diane and Elaine Klimaszewski (1971–)
 Gary and Larry Lane (1975–)
 Spencer and Peyton List (1998–)
 Kristina and Karissa Shannon (1989–)
 Renee and Rosie Tenison (1968–)

Music
 Joshua and Jacob Kiszka, members of Greta Van Fleet
 Alejandra and Claudia Deheza of the band School of Seven Bells
Veronica and Vanessa Merrell, singers, songwriters and youtubers 
 Natalie and Nicole Albino, members of Nina Sky
 Jay (John) and Michael Aston (1957–), of Gene Loves Jezebel (1980–1989; 1995–1997)
 Miko and Yumi Bai of By2
 Didem and Sinem Balık, opera singers
 George and Jack Barnett, members of These New Puritans
 David Michael and Isabella "Bunny" Bennett, members of Steam Powered Giraffe
 Mike and Pete Bishop, members of The Bishops
 Anders and Jonas Björler, members of At the Gates and The Haunted
 Gayle and Gillian Blakeney (1966–), of The Monitors and The Twins
 Claire and Antoinette Cann, piano duo
 Brian and Brandon Casey, members of Jagged Edge
 Jamie and Vincent Cavanagh, members of Anathema
 Andrew and Brian Chaplin (1990–), members of South African-based electro duo Locnville
 ChoA and Way of Crayon Pop
 Alex and Nels Cline (1956–), avant-garde musicians
 Keven "Dino" (1974–2003) and Solomon "Shazam" Conner (1974–), members of H-Town
 Andraé (1942–2015) and Sandra Crouch (1942–), gospel singers
 Katie and Allison Crutchfield, members of P.S. Eliot
 Cherie Currie and Marie Currie, singers
 Kelley and Kim Deal, members of The Breeders
 Aaron and Bryce Dessner, members of The National
 Tom and David Farmer, members of Blackfoot Sue
 Lamb and Lynx Gaede, members of Prussian Blue
 Marge (1948–1996) and Mary Ann Ganser (1948–1970), members of The Shangri-Las
 Robin (1949–2012) and Maurice Gibb (1949–2003), members of the Bee Gees
 Paweł and Łukasz Golec, members of Golec uOrkiestra
 Matt and Luke Goss (29 September 1968–), members of Bros
 John and Edward Grimes (1991–), of Jedward
 Jim and Jon Hager, country duo Hager Twins
 Tim and Phil Hanseroth, members of Brandi Carlile's band
 Christoph and Anton Hochheim, members of The Depreciation Guild
 Rommel and Robert Hinds-Grannum, hip-hop duo A-Game
 Ryu Hwa-young of T-ara and Ryu Hyo-young of Coed School (1993–)
 Warattha and Charattha Imraporn (a.k.a. Noey and Jam), Thai pop duo Neko Jump
 Monica and Gabriela Irimia (1982–), pop duo The Cheeky Girls
 Emi and Yumi Ito (1941–), pop duo The Peanuts
 Yusuke and Hisato Izaki, members of Flame
 Ryan and Gary Jarman (1980–) members of The Cribs
 Kwangmin and Youngmin Jo of Boyfriend (1995–)
 Ben and James Johnston, members of Biffy Clyro
 Len and Rin Kagamine, members of Vocaloid
 Herbert and Harold Kalin, the Kalin Twins
 Marianna and Stephanie Kapsetaki (1991–), piano duo
 Bill and Tom Kaulitz (1989–), members of Tokio Hotel
 Ellen and Alice Kessler, entertainers
 Heather and Jennifer Kinley, country music duo The Kinleys
 Felisha and Fallon King, members of Cherish
 Jeni and Kyndi Niquette, pop rock duo Jen and Kat
 Camille and Kennerly Kitt, harp duo The Harp Twins
 Marcus and Martinus Gunnarsen, pop duo Marcus & Martinus
 Rafi and Sevan Kirder (1980–), members of Red Shamrock and ex-members of Eluveitie
 Ryan and Dan Kowarsky, duo RyanDan
 Supachaya Lattisophonkul and Pailin Rattanasangsatian (a.k.a. Bell and HwaHwa), Thai pop duo China Dolls
 Remy and Pascal Le Boeuf, jazz duo Le Boeuf Brothers
 Nathan and Matthew Leone, members of Madina Lake
 Sari and Romy Lightman, members of Tasseomancy
 Evan and Jaron Lowenstein, duo Evan and Jaron
 Edele Barrett and Keavy Lynch (1979–), members of B*Witched
 Peggy and Patsy Lynn, The Lynns
 Megan and Liz Mace, aka Megan & Liz
 Benji and Joel Madden (1979–), members of Good Charlotte and The Madden Brothers
 Sam and Amanda Marchant, pop duo Samanda
 Michael and John McGlynn (1964–), directors of Anúna
 Wendy and Susannah Melvoin (1964–), singers and former members of Prince's backup band The Revolution
 Jacob and Joshua Miller, members of Nemesis Rising
 Gabriela and Mihaela Modorcea (1985–), duo Indiggo
 Alanis and Wade Morissette (1974–), singer/songwriters
 Sakamoto Naoya and Sakamoto Kazuya, of On/Off
 Christina and Michelle Naughton, piano duo
 Gunnar and Matthew Nelson, members of band Nelson
 Miriam and Olivia Nervo, members of NERVO
 Peter and Paul Okoye, members of P-Square
 Jacob and Joshua Olds, members of Family Force 5
 Ferhan & Ferzan Önder, piano duo
 Lisa and Jessica Origliasso, pop duo The Veronicas
 Simone and Amedeo Pace, members of Blonde Redhead
 Charles (1948–) and John Panozzo (1948–1996), members of Styx
 Güher and Süher Pekinel, piano duo
 Mary and Geraldine Peppin, piano duo
 John and Joshua Pritchard, members of Ruin/Renewal and Brother & Co.
 Tegan and Sara Quin (1980–), members of indie music duo Tegan and Sara
 Charlie and Craig Reid, folk duo The Proclaimers
 John Len Ruela and Len John Ruela Pearce (1991–), members of Justice Crew
 Paul (1948–1992) and Barry Ryan (1948–), formed the group Paul and Barry Ryan
 Gabriel and Michael Saalfield, The Royce Twins, singer songwriters of Australia
 Lee and Tyler Sargent, members of Clap Your Hands Say Yeah
 Keith and Kevin Schultz, members of Keith, Kevin and Air
 Denny and Kenny Scott, members of Swirl 360
 Walter and Wallace "Scotty" Scott, members and lead singers of The Whispers
 Tom and Dan Searle, members of Architects
 Toni and Trisha Sherwood, members of 11:30
 Stuart and James Steele, members of Exit Ten
 Ani and Nia Sulkhanishvili (1988–), piano duo
 Daniel ("Dan") and Eric Tadros, members of Tadros
 Anastasiya and Maria Tolmachevy, child singers; won the Junior Eurovision Song Contest
 Gyða and Kristín Anna Valtýsdóttir, former members of múm
 Janice and Jill Vidal, singers
 Mona and Lisa Wagner, members of The MonaLisa Twins
 Chandra and Leigh Watson, members of The Watson Twins
 Andrew and David Williams, members of The Williams Brothers
 Andy and Jez Williams, members of Doves
 Marvin and Carvin Winans (1958–)
 Ben and Zach Yudin, members of Cayucas
 Alex and Gregg Chamberlain, Twin duo called New Horizon singers, songwriters and Tiktokers
 Ben and Alex Moore, members of Oliver Riot
 Sukriti Kakar and Prakriti Kakar, Indian playback singers
 Wyatt and Fletcher Shears, members of The Garden
 Kenji and Koji Mihara, members of Frederic (band)
 Xion, a member of Oneus, and Dongmyeong, a member of Onewe

Politicians
 Barbara Bush and Jenna Bush Hager (1981–)
 Julian and Joaquin Castro (1974–)
 Angela and Maria Eagle, British MPs and members of the Shadow Cabinet.
 Jaynet and Joseph Kabila (1971–)
 Jarosław (1949–) and Lech Kaczyński (1949–2010)
 Jerry Kilgore and Terry Kilgore (1961–)

In reality television
 Tony and John Alberti (1986–)
 Natalie and Nadiya Anderson (1986–)
 Amanda and Michelle Babin (1988–)
 Isabella and Sofia Bliss (1998–)
 Igor (1949–2022) and Grichka Bogdanoff (1949–2021)
 Thomas and Stephen Buell (1992–)
 Shawn and Claire Buitendorp (1990–)
 Bennett and Winston Butterfield
 Dylan and Taylor Cash
 Jana and John-David Duggar (1990–)
 Jedidiah and Jeremiah Duggar (1998–)
 Haley and Emily Ferguson (1992–)
 Torian and Tre Fields (1992–)
 Roxanne and Nicole Frilot (1983–)
 Cara and Madelyn Gosselin (2000–)
 Cindy and Mindy Hall (1974–)
 Cece and Cate Hamill (2012–)
 Ron and Richard Harris (1953–2014, 1953–)
 Abby and Brittany Hensel (1990–)
 Elza and Nellie Jenkins (1992–)
 Leigh and Leslie Keno (1957–)
 Gary and Larry Lane (1975–)
 Seoeon and Seojun Lee (2013–)
 Allie and Lexi Kaplan (1993–)
 Sam and Amanda Marchant (1988–)
 Chris and Josh Martinez (1987–)
 Dario and Raphy Medrano (1992–)
 Adria Montgomery-Klein and Natalie Montgomery-Carroll (1974–)
 Skyler and Spencer Nick (1992–)
 Becky and Jessie O'Donohue (1980–)
 Ji & Le Otun
 Kristina & Kamila Podvisotskaya
 Zach and Jeremy Roloff (1990–)
 GinaMarie and AnnaMarie Russo (1986–)
 Darcey and Stacey Silva (1974–)
 Drew and Jonathan Scott (1978–); see also Property Brothers, the series and media franchise featuring the pair
 Aliannah and Aleeah Simms (2009–)
 MeMe & Key Vickers
 Danielle and Gabrielle Victor (1988–)
 Adam & Cory Zinker (1992–)

Religion 
 Jacob and Esau, sons of Isaac
 Pharez and Zerah, sons of Judah

Royalty
 Alexander Helios (b. 40 BCE) and Cleopatra Selene II (40 BCE–6 CE)
 Ramon Berenguer II (1053/54–1082) and Berenguer Ramon II (1053/54–1097/99)
 James II of Scotland (1430–1460) and Alexander Stewart, Duke of Rothesay (1430–1430)
 Princess Louise Élisabeth of France (1727–1759) and Princess Henriette of France (1727–1752)
 Philipp, Landgrave of Hesse (1896–1980) and Prince Wolfgang of Hesse (1896–1989)
 Princess Aisha and Princess Sara bint Al Faisal (1997–)
 Prince Alexander and Prince Philip of Yugoslavia (1982–)
 Prince Dimitri of Yugoslavia and Prince Michael of Yugoslavia (1958–)
 Prince Jaime, Count of Bardi and Princess Margarita of Bourbon-Parma (1972–)
 Prince Jean and Princess Margaretha of Luxembourg (1957–)
 Prince Vincent and Princess Josephine of Denmark (2011–), fraternal twins of Crown Prince Fredrik of Denmark and Crown Princess Mary of Denmark
 Shah Mohammad Reza Pahlavi (1919–1980) and Princess Ashraf Pahlavi of Iran (1919–2016)
 Sempad (1276/1277–1310/1311) and Isabella of Armenia (1276/1277–1323)
 Victoire de Valois (1556–1556) and Jeanne de Valois (died as an infant), twin daughters of Henry II of France and Catherine de Medici
Princess Katharine Amalie Christiane Luise (1776–1823) and Caroline of Baden (1776–1841), Caroline was mother of two sets of twins: Elizabeth and Amalie; Sophie and Maria
 Elisabeth Ludovika of Bavaria (1801–1873) and Princess Amalie Auguste of Bavaria (1801–1877), older sisters to Sophie and Maria; older twin daughters of Caroline
 Princess Sophie of Bavaria (1805–1872) and Princess Maria Anna of Bavaria (1805–1877), younger sisters to Elizabeth and Amalie; younger twin daughters of Caroline
 Umberto of Vidin (1999-) and Sofia of Vidin (1999-), twins of Prince Konstantin-Assen of Vidin, Prince of Bulgaria and María García de la Rasilla y Gortázar.
 Princess Gabriella, Countess of Carladès and Jacques, Hereditary Prince of Monaco, (10 December 2014–), fraternal twins of Prince Albert II of Monaco and Princess Charlene of Monaco

Scientists
 Eric and Ian Agol (1970–)
 Alex and Michael Bronstein (1980–)
 Brian and Keith Conrad (1970–)
 Frank and John Craighead (1916–2001 & 2016)
 Mark and Scott Kelly (1964–)
 Maurice Hilleman (1919–2005)
 Stewart and Cyril Marcus (1930–1975)
 Riazuddin (1930–2013) and Fayyazuddin (1930–)
 Erik and Herman Verlinde (1962–)
 Alexei (1952–2007) and Alexander Zamolodchikov (1952–) 
 Sun Zhiwei and Sun Zhihong (1965–)
 Henryk and Tadeusz Iwaniec (1947–)
 Akiva and Isaak Yaglom (1921–2007 & 1988)
 Xand and Chris van Tulleken (1978–)

Sportspeople
 Stanislav and Yaroslav Alshevsky (1991–) 
 Dan and Ran Alterman (1980–)
 Hamit and Halil Altıntop (1982–)
 Mario (1940–) and Aldo Andretti (1940–2020)
 Archil and Shota Arveladze (1973–)
 Arina Averina and Dina Averina (1998–)
 McWilliams and McJoe Arroyo (1985–)
 Herbert (1872–1931) and Wilfred Baddeley (1872–1929)
 Ronde and Tiki Barber (1975–)
 Patrick and Pascal Barré (1959–)
 Guillermo and Gustavo Barros Schelotto (1973–)
 Alec (1918–2010) and Eric Bedser (1918–2006)
 Brie and Nikki Bella, aka The Bella Twins (1983–)
 Lars and Sven Bender (1989–)
 Vasili and Aleksei Berezutski (1982–)
 Mikhail and Vladimir Beschastnykh (1974–)
 Nicholas Bett (1990–2018) and Aron Koech (1990–)
 Bernadett and Ilona Biacsi (1985–)
 Alex and Kate Blackwell (1983–)
 Hannah and Holly Blossom (1988–), real names Lucy and Kelly Knott
 Frank and Ronald de Boer (1970–)
 Kevin and Jonathan Borlée (1988–)
 Tom and Terry Brands (1968–)
 Bob and Mike Bryan (1978–); see also Bryan brothers, their tennis doubles partnership
 Josh and Daniel Bullocks (1983–)
 Heather and Heidi Burge (1971–)
 George Burgess and Thomas Burgess (1992–)
 Chris and Nicky Cadden (1996–)
 Jim and Finlay Calder (1957–)
 José Maria and Juan Miguel "Juanmi" Callejón (1987–)
 Dick and Ian Campbell (1953–)
 Jose and Ozzie Canseco (1964–)
 Dionísio and Domingos Castro (1963–)
 Pierre and Pablo Caesar (1980–)
 Adam and James Chambers (1980–)
 David and Malcolm Changleng (1970–)
Jermall and Jermell Charlo (1990–), American boxers
 Giulio and Nicola Ciotti (1976–)
 Jarron and Jason Collins (1978–)
 Felipe and Manuel Contepomi (1977–)
 Angela and Amber Cope (1983–)
 Tim and Tom Coronel (1972–)
 Alice and Asia D'Amato (2003–)
 Paul Dawson and Chris Dawson (rugby league) (1948–)
 Philipp and David Degen (1983–)
 Isabelle and Véronique Delobel (1978–)
 Jorge and Julio Dely Valdés (1967–)
 Christoph and Markus Dieckmann (1976–)
 Mike and Ray DiMuro (1967–)
 Lukáš and Tomáš Došek (1978–)
 Jeroen and Henrico Drost (1987–)
 James and Jason Dunn (1973–)
 Todd and Troy Dusosky (1976–)
 Alexander and Vladimir Efimkin (1981–)
 José and Vinicio Espinal (1982–)
 Mark and J. Michael Evans (1957–)
 Caroline and Georgina Evers-Swindell (1978–)
 Anthony and Saia Faingaa (1987–)
 Jonathan and Joshua Fatu (1985–), professional wrestlers better known as Jimmy and Jey Uso.
 Sam and Solofa Fatu (1965–), professional wrestlers; Solofa is better known as Rikishi. Solofa is also the father of the aforementioned Jonathan and Joshua Fatu.
 Stephen and Matthew Febey (1969–)
 Bia and Branca Feres (1988–)
 Peter and Chris Ferraro (1973–)
 Garrett and Brett Festerling (1986–)
 Antonio and Emanuele Filippini (1973–)
 Miguel and Javier Flaño (1984–)
 Jörg and Uwe Freimuth (1961–)
 Rogelio and Ramiro Funes Mori (1991–) 
 Ron Futcher and Paul Futcher (1956–)
 Jennifer Gadirova and Jessica Gadirova (2004–)
 Kaokor and Khaosai Galaxy (1959–)
 Alexe Gilles and Piper Gilles (1992–)
 Jack and Josh Goodhue (1995–)
 Chris and James Gowans (1977–)
 Joey and Stephen Graham (1982–)
 Horace and Harvey Grant (1965–)
 Suzanne and Shelley Grant (1984–)
 Michael and Marcus Griffin (1985–)
 Shaquem and Shaquill Griffin (1995–)
 Adam and Joel Griffiths (1979–)
 Ray (1893–1953) and Roy Grimes (1893–1954)
 Emilio and Javi Guerra (1982–)
 Tim (1951–1996) and Tom Gullikson (1951–)
 Arnar and Bjarki Gunnlaugsson (1973–)
 Paul and Morgan Hamm (1982–)
 Harris Brothers (1961–)
 Katrine Lunde Haraldsen and Kristine Lunde-Borgersen (1980–)
 Aaron and Andrew Harrison (1994–)
 Alvin and Calvin Harrison (1974–)
 Hossam and Ibrahim Hassan (1966–)
 Earl and Dave Hebner (1949–)
 Richard and Michael Hills (1963–)
 Pavol and Peter Hochschorner (1979–)
 David and Dean Holdsworth (1968–)
 Matt Hughes and Mark Hughes (1973–)
 David (1937–) and Peter Jackson (1937–1991)
 Martin Johansen and Michael Johansen (1972–)
 Sarah and Karen Josephson (1964–)
 Dora and Larissa Kalaus (1996–)
 Jenny and Susanna Kallur (1981–)
 Michael and Will Keane (1993–)
 René and Willy van de Kerkhof (1951–)
 Gözde and Özge Kırdar (1985–)
 Daniela (1982–2008) and Sandra Klemenschits (1982–)
 Michael and Nigel Kol (1962–)
 Erwin and Helmut Kremers (1949–)
 Monique and Jocelyne Lamoureux (1989–)
 Darjuš and Kšyštof Lavrinovič (1979–)
 Lo Chih-an and Lo Chih-en (1988–)
 Nathan and Ryan Lonie (1983–)
 Brook and Robin Lopez (1988–)
 Alistair and Stewart Lord (1940–)
 Henrik and Joel Lundqvist (1982–)
 Leona and Lisa Maguire (1994–)
 Phil and Steve Mahre (1957–)
 Hamish and James Marshall (1979–)
 Caleb and Cody Martin (1995–)
 Pat and Luke McCormack (1995–)
 Devin and Jason McCourty (1987–)
 Robby and Ross McCrorie (1998–)
 Devon and Ricardo McDonald (1969–)
 Jamie and Gavin McDonnell (1986–)
 Marlin (1940–2006) and Mike McKeever (1940–1967)
 Donnie and Ronnie McKinnon (1940–)
 Eissa Meer and Ibrahim Meer (1967–)
 Coco and Kelly Miller (1978–)
 Jason and Andrew Moloney (1991–)
 Kazuyuki and Kōji Morisaki (1981–)
 Brett and Josh Morris (1987–)
 Markieff and Marcus Morris (1989–)
 Isabelle and Béatrice Mouthon (1966–)
 Mildred and Marianne Muis (1968–)
 Jacob and Josh Murphy (1995–)
 Akona and Odwa Ndungane (1981–)
 Phil Neville and Tracey Neville (1977–)
 Antônio Rodrigo Nogueira and Antônio Rogério Nogueira (1976–), Brazil
 Dennis and Gérard de Nooijer (1969–), Netherlands
 Amanda and Isabelle Nylander (1990–), Sweden
 Emilia and Erika Nyström (1983–), Finland
 Federico and Salomón Obama (2000–), Equatorial Guinea
 Kenji and Tsugiharu Ogiwara (1969–), Japan 
 Amanda and Tess Oliveira (1987–), Brazil
 Hiromi and Takami Ominami (1975–), Japan
 Edu and Joan Oriol (1986–)
 Javier (1974–2018) and Ricardo Otxoa (1974–2001), Spain
 Flávio and Marco Paixão (1984–)
 Ashley and Courtney Paris (1987–)
 Callum and Matt Parkinson (1996–)
 Maksym (1988–2008) and Pavlo Pashayev (1988–)
 Paula and María Paulina Pérez (1996–)
 Elisabeth and Patricia Pinedo (1981–)
 Mike and Dan Pletch (1983–)
 Kristýna and Karolína Plíšková (1992–)
 Jolanta and Rasa Polikevičiūtė (1970–)
 Paula and Stela Posavec (1996–)
 Mike and Maurkice Pouncey (1989–)
 Andreas and Thomas Ravelli (1959–)
 Rex and Rob Ryan (1962–)
 Ebbe and Peter Sand (1972–)
 Hisato and Yūto Satō (1982–)
 Shu and Kei Sato (1977–)
 Andy and Walt Schmetzer (1968–)
 Chris and Brad Scott (1976–)
 Daniel and Henrik Sedin (1980–)
 Antonio and Piero Selvaggio (1958–)
 Adam and Troy Selwood (1984–)
 Fábio and Rafael Pereira da Silva (1990–), Brazil

 Shigeru and Takeshi So (1953–)
 Pavel and Petr Štercl (1966–)
 Patrik and Peter Sundström (1961–)
 Ron and Rich Sutter (1963–)
 Vladimir and Valeriy Sydorenko (1976–)
 Carl and Charles Thomas (1969–)
 Tõnu and Toomas Tõniste (1967–)
 Karyne and Sarah Steben (1974–)
 Mike and Todd Shane (1967–)
 Dick and Tom Van Arsdale (1943–)
 Mick and Tim van Dijke (2000–)
 Jack and Jamie Vance (1997–)
 Roel and Mansueto Velasco (1972–)
 Peter and Martin Velits (1985–)
 Zlatko and Zoran Vujović (1958–)
 Darryl and Shane Wakelin (1974–)
 Ray and Rod Wallace (1969–)
 Kevin and Kerrod Walters (1967–)
 Mark and Steve Waugh (1965–)
 Elliot and Andrew Weber (1983–)
 Dora and Cora Webber (1958–)
 Alan and Gary Whetton (1959–)
 Cameron and Tyler Winklevoss (1981–)
 Adam and Simon Yates (1992–)
 Cristian and Damiano Zenoni (1977–)
 Marcin and Michał Żewłakow (1976–)
 Bengt and Björn Zikarsky (1967–)

Twins notable in each of their own separate fields 
 Paul and Andrea Boardman (1967–)
 Jill and Jacqueline Hennessy (1968–)
 Laverne Cox and M Lamar (1972–)
 Rita (1909–2012) and Paola Levi-Montalcini (1909–2000)
 Alexandra and Caroline Paul (1963–)
 Charlotte and Samantha Ronson (1977–)
 Carol and Mark Thatcher (1953–)
 Gloria Morgan Vanderbilt (1904–1965) and Thelma Furness, Viscountess Furness (1904–1970)

Other
 Johnny and Luther Htoo (c. 1988–), guerrilla leaders
 Philip and Andrew Oliver (1968–), video game developers
 Mary-Kate and Ashley Olsen (1986–), fashion designers
 David and Peter Turnley, photojournalists
 Poto and Cabengo (1970–), who invented a language to speak to each other

Conjoined twins 
 Carmen and Lupita Andrade (2000–)
 Ladan and Laleh Bijani (1974-2003)
 Chang and Eng Bunker (1811–1874), the original "Siamese twins"
 Ronnie and Donnie Galyon (1951-2020), the world’s oldest conjoined twins to ever live. 
 Ilona and Judit Gófitz (1701–1723)
 Abby and Brittany Hensel (born 1990)
 Daisy and Violet Hilton (1908–1969)
 Millie and Christine McKoy (1851–1912)
 Radhika and Dudhika Nayak (born 1888; Dudhika died in 1902, Radhika in 1903)
 Spider Girls, Ganga and Jamuna Mondal (born Ayara and Jayara Ratun in 1969 or 1970)

Notable people with a non-famous twin
 Brooke Adams, fraternal twin sister
 James Alexandrou, twin sister
 Chad Allen, twin sister
 Stephen K. Amos, twin sister
 Carl Anderson, twin brother died as an infant
 Kofi Annan, twin sister
 Richie Ashburn, twin sister
 Lillian Asplund, twin brother
 Gracia Baur, twin sister
 Marc Bartra, twin brother
 Blaze Berdahl, twin sister
 Josh Bernstein, twin brother
 Jonathon Blum, twin sister died in a house fire in 2004
 Eugenie Bouchard, fraternal twin sister
 Crystal Bowersox, fraternal twin brother
 Nicholas Brendon, twin brother
 Bob Brown, twin sister
 Gisele Bündchen, fraternal twin sister
 Aaron Carter, twin sister
 Gabrielle Carteris, twin brother
 Candis Cayne, fraternal twin brother
 Karen Cellini, twin sister
 Justin Chambers, twin brother
 Keith Chegwin, twin brother
 Gary Cherone, fraternal twin brother
 Montgomery Clift, twin sister
 Carlo Colaiacovo, brother
 Henry Cooper, twin brother
 Bucky Covington, twin brother
 Curley Culp, twin sister
 Andrew Daddo, fraternal twin
 Ann B. Davis, twin sister
 Anthony Davis, twin sister
 Cody Deal, twin brother
 Fennis Dembo, twin sister
 Philip K. Dick, twin sister died after birth
 Vin Diesel, fraternal twin brother
 Nyle DiMarco, fraternal twin brother
 Jamie Dimon, fraternal twin brother
 Duffy, twin sister
 Alain Eizmendi, identical twin brother
 Marc Elliott, twin sister
 Karen Elson, fraternal twin sister
 John Elway, twin sister
 Theo Epstein, twin brother
 Mike Espy, twin sister
 Jerry Falwell, twin brother
 Joseph Fiennes, twin brother
 Caroline Flack, twin sister
 John "Ecstasy" Fletcher (of Whodini), twin brother
 Adam Foote, twin sister
 Samantha Futerman, identical twin sister raised separately as a citizen of France
 Max Gail, twin sister
 Lucía García, twin brothers
 Dave Gorman, twin brother
 Eva Green, fraternal twin sister
 Jerry Hall, twin sister
 Linda Hamilton, twin sister
 Victor Davis Hanson, fraternal twin brother
 Ella Harper, unnamed twin brother died shortly after birth
 Gordon Hayward, twin sister
 Jon Heder, identical twin brother
 William Randolph Hearst, twin died as an infant
 Marilu Henner, twin sister
 John Hensley, fraternal twin sister
 Ryan Howard, twin brother
 Sabrina Ionescu, twin brother
 Urtzi Iriondo, identical twin brother
 Carlin Isles, twin sister
 Marlon Jackson, twin brother died at birth
 David Jason, twin brother died during birth
 Chris Joannou, twin sister
 Scarlett Johansson, twin brother
 Siva Kaneswaran, twin brother
 Jay Kay, twin brother died at birth
 Cory Kennedy, fraternal twin sister
 Joseph P. Kennedy III, fraternal twin brother
 Junsu Kim, fraternal twin brother
 David Kohan, twin brother
 Ashton Kutcher, fraternal twin brother
 Gabriel Landeskog, twin sister
 Chris Lane, twin brother
 Kate Lawler, twin sister
 Gigi Leung, twin brother
 Liberace, twin died as an infant
 Tony Liberatore, twin brother
 Cory Lidle, twin brother
 Jon Lindsay, fraternal twin brother
 Thad Luckinbill, twin brother
 Tom Luginbill, twin sister
 Marcus Luttrell, twin brother
 John Maine, fraternal twin brother
 Rami Malek, identical twin brother
 Shawn Marion, twin sister
 Susie Maroney, fraternal twin
 Logan Marshall-Green, twin brother
 Roberta McCain, twin sister
 Paul McDermott
 Jay McGuiness, identical twin brother
 Gene McKinney, twin brother
 Victor A. McKusick, twin brother
 Alanis Morissette, twin brother
 Alma Miettinen, twin sister
 Burt Munro, twin sister died at birth
 Olly Murs, fraternal twin brother
 Mandy Musgrave, identical twin sister
 Maye Musk, identical twin sister
 Gaute Ormåsen, fraternal twin brother
 Jason Orange, twin brother
 John Osborne, twin sister
 Melanie Oudin, twin sister
 Autumn Phillips, twin brother
 Parker Posey, twin brother
 Elvis Presley, twin brother died at birth
 Richard Quest, twin sister
 Megan Rapinoe, twin sister
 Dack Rambo, twin brother
 Efren Ramirez, identical twin brother
 Judy Reyes, twin sister
 Pekka Rinne, twin sister
 Marty Robbins, twin sister
 Isabella Rossellini, twin sister
 J. D. Roth, twin sister
 Stark Sands, fraternal twin brother
 Gorka Santamaría, identical twin brother
 Brian Schatz, twin brother
 Judith Scott, twin sister
 Teemu Selänne, twin brother
 Sab Shimono
 Bill Shorten, twin brother
 Lori Singer, twin brother
 Tasha Smith, twin sister
 Katy Steele, twin brother
 Curtis Strange, twin brother
 Ed Sullivan, twin brother died as an infant
 Sandra Sully
 Charles Sumner, twin sister
 Kiefer Sutherland, twin sister
 Amanda Tapping, twin brother
 Adam Thomas, fraternal twin brother
 Jim Thome, twin sister
 Jim Thorpe, twin brother
 Frances Tiafoe, twin brother
 Jon Tickle, twin brother
 Garrett Tierney, identical twin brother
 Paul Tsongas, twin sister
 Ronan Tynan, twin brother died as an infant
 Derek Thompson, twin sister
 Sarah Vowell, twin sister
 Emppu Vuorinen, twin brother
 Shayne Ward, twin sister
 Ellen G. White, twin sister
 Billy Dee Williams, twin sister
 Ricky Williams, twin sister
 Kane Williamson, twin brother
 Marvin Winans, twin brother
 Brad Womack, twin brother
 Bang Yong Guk, twin brother

Twin records
 Jane Haskin (1924-2001) and John Prosser Haskin, Jr. (1924-2004), Guinness World Records “World’s Heaviest Twins” with an aggregate weight of 12.58 kg (27 on 12 Oz), were born to Mary Ann Haskin (USA), of Fort Smith, Arkansas, USA on 20 February 1924.
 Gin Kanie (1892–2001) and Kin Narita (1892–2000), widely known for their longevity 
 Benny (1947–2001) and Billy McGuire (1947–1979), heaviest ever twins at 814 and 784 pounds. Born in Hendersonville, NC, US in 1947. Billy died in 1979, Benny in 2001.
 Michael and James Lanier, World's tallest twins, at 7' 6" or 2.286 m.
Edward and Daniel Hemberg (2005–), heaviest twins born in New Zealand (and at the time Australasia) via natural delivery (Edward 3.54 kg and Daniel 3.76 kg)
 Tashi and Nungshi Malik (1991–), world's first female twins to scale Everest together, first twins and siblings to scale Seven Summits together, Ski to North & South Pole together and to complete Explorers Grand Slam together and youngest persons to achieve it

Fictional characters who are twins

See also
 List of triplets
 List of multiple births
 Twins in mythology
 Conjoined twins

References

 
Twins
Lists of sibling groups